Matthew Lewis may refer to:

Matthew Lewis (writer) (1775–1818), British Gothic novelist and dramatist
Matthew Lewis (actor) (born 1989), English actor, best known for portraying Neville Longbottom in the Harry Potter films
Matthew Butler (Tiswas) (born 1974), British child performer who appeared on Tiswas, now known as Matthew Lewis
Matthew Jay Lewis, British actor 
Matt K. Lewis, American political blogger, commentator, and contributor to The Daily Beast
Matthew Lewis (footballer) (born 1990), Australian association football (soccer) player for A-League side Central Coast Mariners
Matt Lewis (soccer) (born 1996), American soccer player
Matty Lewis (born 1975), American singer and co-frontman of the Rock band Zebrahead
Matthew Lewis (photographer) (born 1930), American photographer and editor
Matt Lewis (wheelchair rugby) (born 1987), Australian wheelchair rugby player
Matthew Dennis Lewis, American actor
Matt Lewis (basketball) (born 1998), American basketball player